Girlfriends (French title: Mes copines) is a 2006 Franco-Belgian comedy film directed by Sylvie Ayme and starring Stéphanie Sokolinski, Djena Tsimba, Léa Seydoux, and Anne-Sophie Franck.

Synopsis
Manon, Djena, Aurore, and Marie are four high school friends who dream of winning the Défi dance, an inter-school hip hop competition.

Cast and characters

 Soko as Manon
 Djena Tsimba as Djena
 Léa Seydoux as Aurore
 Anne-Sophie Franck as Marie
 Xavier Hosten as Cédric
 Nicolas Jouxtel as Manon's little brother
 Patrick Braoudé as Doisneau
 Rossy de Palma as Marie's mother
 Serge Riaboukine as Manon's father
 Thierry René as Djena's father
 Jean-Michel Noirey as Marie's father
 Sophie Frison as Leslie
 Véronique Biefnot as Aurore's mother
 Jean-Yves Berteloot as Aurore's father
 Thomas Ancora as Éric
 Philippe du Janerand as a server
 Nicolas Gob as Pierre
 Sara Martins as Shaheen
 Caroline Veyt as Juliette
 Julien Béramis as Navin
 Soufiane Guerrab as Alexandre

References

External links
 

2006 films
2000s buddy comedy films
Belgian comedy films
2006 directorial debut films
French female buddy films
2000s French-language films
French buddy comedy films
2000s female buddy films
2006 comedy films
French-language Belgian films
2000s French films